Sura xylocopiformis is a moth of the family Sesiidae. It is known from South Africa.

References

Endemic moths of South Africa
Sesiidae
Moths of Africa
Moths described in 1856